Across Suez, subtitled "The Battle of the Chinese Farm October 15, 1973" is a board wargame published by Simulations Publications (SPI) in 1980 that simulates operational level ground combat between Egypt and Israel at the Battle of the Chinese Farm during the 1973 Arab-Israeli War.

Description
During the Arab-Israeli War of October 1973, Israeli forces tried to open a bridgehead over the Suez Canal to exploit a perceived gap in the Egyptian line, and instead ran up against a strong force. The battle took place in the vicinity of an Egyptian research station that used Japanese equipment. Israeli observers mistook the Japanese Kanji characters on the  machinery for Chinese Hanzi, leading to the misnomer "The Chinese Farm". Across Suez is a introductory-level simulation of this battle.

Components
  paper hex grid map
 40 die-cut counters
 rules booklet
 various playing aids
 a six-sided die
 small  game box

Gameplay
Each turn represent 8 hours of game time, and takes the following sequence:
Israeli movement
Israeli combat
Egyptian movement
Egyptian combat
The game lasts seven turns.

Victory conditions
Israeli victory: The Israeli player must 
 place a bridging unit on a specific hex on the Suez Canal
 move a minimum of six combat units across the Suez
 maintain an unblocked line of communications to the bridging unit at the end of the last turn
Egyptian victory: Prevent any of the Istraeli victory conditions.

Publication history
In 1980, SPI published four "gateway" games in small boxes with simplified rules, intended to introduce new players to the wargaming hobby: Leningrad; The Big Red One (originally titled Bulge); Austerlitz; and Across Suez, a game designed by  Jim Dunnigan and Mark Herman, with cartography and graphic design by Redmond A. Simonsen.

After SPI went out of business, Decision Games acquired the license for Across Suez and republished it in 1995. Decision added two variants (airborne landings and amphibious landings) and two new scenarios, which required 16 additional Arab and Israeli counters and 18 Soviet and American counters.

Hobby Japan published a Japanese version.

Reception
In Issue 5 of Casus Belli, Henri Gregoire thought that the rules "reflect the surprise and shock of the first fight." He agreed this was a good game for beginners, pointing out that with only seven turns, the game was quick, and could be completed in two hours.

Other reviews
Campaign #102
Paper Wars #24
Zone of Control #5
Richard Berg's Review of Games #7

Sources 
 Elusive Victory: The Arab-Israeli Wars, 1947-1974, by Trevor N. Dupuy, Harper and Row, New York, 1978
 "Across Suez, The Battle of the Chinese Farm, October 15, 1973", by Trevor N. Dupuy, in Strategy & Tactics #82, September-October 1980
 "Across Suez", by Richard Berg, in Richard Berg's Review of Games #7, December 1980
 "Across Suez: A Game Review", by Henry C. Robinette, in Campaign Magazine #102, March-April 1982
 On the Banks of the Suez, by Avraham Adan, Presidio Press, 1991
 "Across Suez/Go to Origins!", by Rich Erwin, in Paper Wars #24, March 1996
 "Across Suez", by Rick D. Stuart, in Zone of Control Magazine #5, Winter 1996
 Arabs at War: Military Effectiveness 1948-1991, by Kenneth M. Pollack, University of Nebraska Press, Lincoln, Nebraska, 2002
 Crossing of the Suez, The, by Lt. General Saad El Shazly, American Mideast Research, revised English edition, 2003

References

External links 
 
 Across Suez at Web-Grognards
  Across Suez at ConsimWorld

Board games introduced in 1980
Simulations Publications games
Jim Dunnigan games
Yom Kippur War board wargames